Jakub Krupa (born 19 June 1985) is a Czech handball
player, currently playing for HT Tatran Prešov in the Slovak Extraliga.
He also plays for the Czech national handball team.
He also played for HC Gurmány Zubří.

External links
 Jakub Krupa´s profile

Czech male handball players
1985 births
Living people
People from Valašské Meziříčí
Czech expatriate sportspeople in Romania
Expatriate handball players
Sportspeople from the Zlín Region